Fliess Bay is a bay lying immediately west of Fitzroy Point along the north coast of Joinville Island. The name appears on an Argentine government chart from 1957. It was named "Caleta Almirante Fliess" after Admiral Felipe Fliess (1878–1952) who, as a lieutenant, was commander of the Argentine navy group detached for duty with the crew of the ship Uruguay in 1903, on the occasion of the rescue expedition to the members of the Swedish Antarctic Expedition (1901–04) led by Dr. Otto Nordenskiöld.

References 

Bays of Graham Land
Landforms of the Joinville Island group